Badminton competition has been in the Universiade since 2007, with singles, doubles and mixed events for both men and women.

Events

Editions

Medal table 
Last updated after the 2017 Summer Universiade

Winners

Individual competition

Mixed team competition

References 
International Badminton Federation

 
Sports at the Summer Universiade
Universiade